Kelita is a genus of bees belonging to the family Apidae.

The species of this genus are found in Southern America.

Species:
 Kelita argentina Rozen, 1997 
 Kelita chilensis (Friese, 1916)

References

Apidae